State Route 91 (SR 91), formerly known as Inter-county Highway 91 until 1921 and State Highway 91 in 1922,  is a north–south state highway in the northeastern portion of the U.S. state of Ohio.  Its southern terminus is at U.S. Route 224 (East Waterloo Road) in Springfield Township, east of Akron.  Its northern terminus is at State Route 283 (Lakeshore Boulevard) on the Timberlake/Eastlake border less than one mile (1.6 km) south of Lake Erie.

The route is known as Canton Road from its southern terminus to just north of its interchange with Interstate 76 in Akron (Canton Road continues south as County Route 66, a former portion of State Route 8).  North of this interchange, it is called Darrow Road until it enters the city of Tallmadge, where it is named South Avenue south of the Tallmadge Circle, and North Avenue north of the circle.  It next passes through the Munroe Falls village limits and is known as South Main Street and North Main Street.  It becomes Darrow Road once again in the city of Stow and for its remaining length in Summit County, aside from within the Hudson city limits, where it is South and North Main Streets. 

In Cuyahoga and Lake Counties, State Route 91 is known as SOM Center Road, named for the fact that it runs through the centers of the original Solon, Orange, and Mayfield Townships in Cuyahoga County.

The State Route 91 corridor includes examples of Connecticut Western Reserve town planning, particularly the public squares of Hudson, Tallmadge, and Mayfield. It also dissects several affluent communities of Northeast Ohio, including Hudson, Gates Mills, Pepper Pike, Hunting Valley, Moreland Hills and Solon .

History
1912 – Route runs from Stow to Chagrin Falls
1970 – Extended south to U.S. Route 224 in Springfield Township along former State Route 8 alignment; extended north to Eastlake as a divided highway

Major intersections

References

External links

James A. Garfield Birthplace
Cleveland Metroparks
SR 91 via Google Maps

091
Transportation in Cuyahoga County, Ohio
Transportation in Lake County, Ohio
Transportation in Summit County, Ohio